Ausforming, also known as low and high temperature thermomechanical treatments, is a method used to increase the hardness and toughness of an alloy by simultaneously tempering, rapid cooling, deforming and quenching  to change its shape and refine the microstructure. This treatment is an important part in the processing of steel.

References 

Metal heat treatments
Steelmaking